Danny Saltz defeated Chip Hooper 4–6, 6–3, 6–4, 6–4 to win the 1984 Heineken Open singles competition. John Alexander was the defending champion.

Seeds
A champion seed is indicated in bold text while text in italics indicates the round in which that seed was eliminated.

  Chris Lewis (quarterfinals)
  Chip Hooper (final)
  Wally Masur (second round)
  John Alexander (quarterfinals)
  Brad Drewett (semifinals)
  Russell Simpson (quarterfinals)
  Larry Stefanki (semifinals)
  Lloyd Bourne (second round)

Draw

Key
 Q – Qualifier
 WO – Walkover
 NB: The Final was the best of 5 sets while all other rounds were the best of 3 sets.

Final

Section 1

Section 2

External links
 Association of Tennis Professional (ATP) – 1984 Men's Singles draw

ATP Auckland Open
1984 Grand Prix (tennis)